The Eleven O'Clock is a 2016 Australian live-action short film directed by Derin Seale. It was inspired by a sketch from the television series A Bit of Fry and Laurie.  It was nominated for an Academy Award for Best Live Action Short Film at the 90th Academy Awards in 2018.

Plot
A session between a psychiatrist and his patient, delusively believing he is the psychiatrist, gets out of hand.

Cast
 Josh Lawson as Terry Phillips
 Damon Herriman as Nathan Klein
 Jessica Donoghue as Linda
 Gregory J. Thorsby as Security Guard
 Eliza Logan as Daisy
 Alyssa McClelland as Donna

Reception

Critical response
The Eleven O'Clock has an approval rating of 100% on review aggregator website Rotten Tomatoes, based on 10 reviews, and an average rating of 8.80/10 among all critics. On IMDb, the short holds a review score of 7.6, with 960 votes.

Awards and nominations
 Nominated: Academy Award for Best Live Action Short Film 
 Won: Australian Academy of Cinema and Television Arts (AACTA) Award for Best Short Fiction Film

References

External links
 

2016 films
2016 short films
Australian drama short films
2016 drama films
2010s English-language films